Agnes Taaka also known as Taaka Agnes Wejuli (born 3 April 1980) is a Ugandan politician, Social Worker, and legislator. She is the district woman representative of Bugiri District. She served in the ninth, tenth and eleventh Parliament of Uganda as the Member of Parliament. She belongs to the ruling political party, National Resistance Movement. She is the current Woman Member of Parliament of Bugiri District in period (2021-2026) after being declared as winner in the just concluded presidential and parliamentary elections in Uganda.

Education and background 
She is married. She completed her Primary Leaving Examinations from Kigulu Girls Primary school in 1992 and later joined Bukoyo Senior Secondary School for her Uganda Certificate of Education in 1996. In 1999, Agnes joined Iganga Senior Secondary School for Uganda Advanced Certificate of Education (UACE). She was awarded a bachelor's degree of Arts in Social Science from Makerere University in 2004. Additionally in 2007, she went to advance her studies and was awarded a certificate in Law (Administrative Officers Law Course) from Law Development Centre, Kampala.

Work experience before politics 
Between 2006 and 2014, Agnes worked as the Community Development Officer at Bugiri District Local Government and was later promoted to Senior Community Development Officer in Bugiri Town Council and worked from 2014 to 2015. From 2010 to 2012, she was later appointed as the Acting Sub-County Chief of Bugiri District Local Government. She leads Taaka Agnes Wejuli Development Foundation.

Political career 
From 2016 to date, she has served as the Woman Member of Parliament for Bugiri Constituency. During her service as the Member of Parliament at the Parliament of Uganda, Agnes has served on additional role as the Committee on Agriculture. Her hobbies are netball, and dancing; and she has special interest in mentoring poor households, community groups and youths. She joined the Uganda Women Parliamentary Association (UWOPA) in the 10th parliament. At Uganda Women Parliamentary Association (UWOPA), she serves on the committee of the Employment Act/Economic Empowerment, which is a collaboration With Civil Society As A Mechanism For Conducting Advocacy in the Four Main Strategic Directions.

See also 

 List of members of the eleventh Parliament of Uganda
 List of members of the tenth Parliament of Uganda
 List of members of the ninth Parliament of Uganda
 Bugiri District
 National Resistance Movement
 Member of Parliament
 Parliament of Uganda

External links 

 Website of the Parliament of Uganda
 Agnes Taaka on Twitter
 Agnes Taaka on Facebook

References 

Living people
1980 births
National Resistance Movement politicians
Members of the Parliament of Uganda
Women members of the Parliament of Uganda
People from Bugiri District
Makerere University alumni
21st-century Ugandan women politicians
21st-century Ugandan politicians